Sidharth Bharathan (born 26 May 1983), is an Indian actor, screenwriter and film director who prominently works in Malayalam films.

Career
The son of director Bharathan and actress K. P. A. C. Lalitha, he began his film career through the Malayalam film Nammal (2002) as an actor. He made his directorial debut and played the lead role in Nidra (2012), it was a remake of the 1981 Malayalam film of the same name directed by his father. Sidharth has also worked as a scenarist for the film Isha, a segment in the anthology film 5 Sundarikal.

Accident & Aftermath
Sidharth was seriously injured in an accident on 11 September 2015. The Ford Figo car he was driving hit a wall on the road at Chambakkara near Kochi and the actor sustained serious injuries in his leg and head. He was in the ventilator of the Medical Trust Hospital in Kochi.

Personal life
He was married to Anju Mohan Das since 12 December 2008 for about five years and later divorced in 2013. On 31 August 2019, he married Sujina. They have a daughter Kayalvizhi born on 22 July 2020.

Filmography

As actor

As director

References

External links
 

Living people
Male actors from Chennai
Male actors in Malayalam cinema
Indian male film actors
Malayalam film directors
21st-century Indian film directors
1983 births
21st-century Indian male actors
Film directors from Chennai